The 2014 6 Hours of Fuji was an endurance sports car racing event held at the Fuji Speedway, Oyama, Japan on 10–12 October 2014, and served as the fifth race of the 2014 FIA World Endurance Championship season. Sébastien Buemi and Anthony Davidson won the race driving the No. 8 Toyota TS040 Hybrid car.

Qualifying

Qualifying result
Pole position winners in each class are marked in bold.

Race

Race result
Class winners in bold.

References

6 Hours of Fuji
Fuji 6 Hours
Fuji
Fuji 6 Hours